The Hogan Family is an American television family sitcom. The series was on NBC for five seasons and then on CBS for its final season, running for a total of 110 episodes that aired between March 1, 1986 and July 20, 1991.

Series overview

Episodes

Season 1 (1986)

Season 2 (1986–87)

Season 3 (1987–88)

Season 4 (1988–89)

Season 5 (1989–90)

Season 6 (1990–91)

References

External links 
 

Lists of American sitcom episodes